The International Wrestling Alliance (IWA) was an independent professional wrestling promotion based in the province of Manitoba in Canada. It was initially founded as the West Four Wrestling Alliance (WFWA) in 1973 by Tony Condello , under which it ran until that name changed in 1994.

Championships

IWA Alumni
The roster consisted of mostly Canadian wrestlers, but also included some American wrestlers.

Singles wrestlers
Akim Singh
"Bulldog" Bob Brown
Chi Chi Cruz
E.Z. Ryder
Gerry Morrow
Jim Brunzell
Mad Dog Peloquin
Male Nurse
The Natural
Ron Ritchie
Stan Saxton
Steve Rivers
Lance Storm
Chris Jericho
Sexton Hardcastle
Lenny St.Claire

Tag teams
Bobby Jones & French Mad Dog
Dave Gobeil & Tony Condello
Earl the Orderly & The Male Nurse
Ghost Riders (Chris Windham & Jackie Anderson)

References

External links
 WFWA Title Histories

Canadian professional wrestling promotions